The 2003 Hasseröder Premier League was a professional non-ranking snooker tournament that was played from 11 January to 11 May 2003.

Marco Fu won in the final 9–5 against Mark Williams.

Prize fund 
The breakdown of prize money for this year is shown below: 
Winner: £45,000
Runner-up: £20,000
Semi-final: £12,500
Frame-win: £500 (only in league phase)
Highest break: £6,000
Total: £180,000

League phase

Top four qualified for the play-offs. If points were level then most frames won determined their positions. If two players had an identical record then the result in their match determined their positions. If that ended 4–4 then the player who got to four first was higher. (Breaks above 50 shown between (parentheses); century breaks are indicated with bold.)

 11 January – Borough Hall, Hartlepool, England
 John Higgins 6–2 Steve Davis → (50) 83–30, 35–85, (97)-31, 62–68, (59) 63–39, (66) 94–36, 67–47, (122)-18
 Mark Williams 1–7 Marco Fu → 0–74, 73–34, 4–94 (68), 46–59, 0-(139), 0–134 (84), 51–53, 0–85 (79)
 Ronnie O'Sullivan 6–2 Jimmy White → 44–63, (54) 68–42, (51) 86–11, 64–16, (67) 112–14, (78)-21, (100)-1, 41–67
 12 January – Borough Hall, Hartlepool, England
 John Higgins 3–5 Jimmy White → 24–63, 42–55(49), 15-(72), (55) 69–57, 4-(81), 69–14, 0-(131), 77–9
 Ronnie O'Sullivan 5–3 Steve Davis → (105) 110–11, (62) 72–48, 59–64, 54–53, (92)-6, 5–92 (88), 0-(95), (70) 71–5
 Mark Williams 6–2 Peter Ebdon → (102) 106–7, (125) 137–0, 1–86 (52), 60–31, (71) 75–33, (78) 82–0, 73–31, 21–114 (108)
 18 January – Floral Hall, Southport, England
 Peter Ebdon 6–2 John Higgins → 70–26, 75-(67), 0-(90), 0–136 (104), 57–49, 65–45, (67)-12, 69–5
 Steve Davis 6–2 Jimmy White → 68–27, 0–72, 65–41, (53) 65–12, 53–42, 64–25, (54)-66, (91) 92–8
 19 January – Floral Hall, Southport, England
 Ronnie O'Sullivan 5–3 Marco Fu → 0-(100), (101) 105–0, 0–97 (89), 50–65, 65–40, (55) 72–9, (80)-4, (51) 82–31
 Peter Ebdon 4–4 Jimmy White → 8-(58), 56–27, 51–67, 24–57, (53) 54–63 (57), 69–46, (85) 90–7, 61–33
 Mark Williams 5–3 John Higgins → (123) 124–0, (50) 71–31, (56) 83–32, 0–72, 0-(132), 0-(73), (69) 70–0, 81–31
 15 February – Flint Pavilion, Flint, Wales
 Steve Davis 4–4 Marco Fu → (61) 73–25, 18–59, 26-(88), 56–21, 1–107 (102), 14-(111), (50) 68–66, 60–29
 Ronnie O'Sullivan 5–3 Mark Williams → 0–67 (53), 28–65, 9–66, (114) 118–0, (77)-0, (58) 73–55, 67–34, (93) 101–0
 16 February – Flint Pavilion, Flint, Wales
 Peter Ebdon 5–3 Steve Davis → (62) 97–24, (134) 138–1, 0-(104), 22–114 (110), (53) 82–0, 39–72 (55), (53) 65–53, (52) 75–6
 John Higgins 4–4 Marco Fu → 38–84, (83) 97–18, 76–0, 1–79 (52), (88)-4, 63–29, 44- 62, 43–58
 Mark Williams 6–2 Jimmy White → 67–16, 64–63, 8–76 (53), 78–11, 70–14, (52) 58–50, (56) 60–37, 29–60 (51)
 22 March – Colwyn Bay Leisure Centre, Colwyn Bay, Wales
 Peter Ebdon 4–4 Marco Fu → 0–84, 42–73, (69)-16, 17–67, 60–12, 1–81 (57), 70–54, 57–56
 Ronnie O'Sullivan 5–3 John Higgins → 65–64 (56), (91)-0, 50–63, (61) 69–1, 73–14, 42–83 (73), 62–25, 5–88 (79)
 23 March – Colwyn Bay Leisure Centre, Colwyn Bay, Wales
 Mark Williams 6–2 Steve Davis → 1–62 (61), 70–45, 53–20, 17–63, (62) 89–26, 65–58 (50), 78–41, 75–24
 Jimmy White 6–2 Marco Fu → 65–52, (71) 72–16, 73–29, 57–43, (75) 81–24, 11–72 (59), 14–75 (68), (50) 74–1
 Ronnie O'Sullivan 5–3 Peter Ebdon → 0–134 (125), 75–41, (52) 89–6, (93) 101–27, (72) 85–39, 56–83, (90) 121–1, 0-(106)

Play-offs 
10–11 May – Crowtree Leisure Centre, Sunderland, England

*58–69, 83–25, 24–66, (63) 75–8, 9-(67), 0–98 (57), 72–60 (53), 39–80 (55), (67)-(60), 42–61
**(58) 73–26, (80)-(52), (100) 104–32, 23–82 (57), (54) 74–57, 49–57, (56) 71–48, 59–32
***(59) 83–22, 44–82, 68-(57), 50–65, 0-(138'), 69–52, 0–113 (99), 0–66 (65), (103)-0, (57) 58–33, (71) 85–49, 80–30, (51) 52–11, (66) 78–0

Century breaks

 139, 111, 103, 102, 100  Marco Fu
 138, 125, 123, 102, 100  Mark Williams
 134, 125, 108, 106  Peter Ebdon
 132, 122, 104  John Higgins
 131  Jimmy White
 114, 105, 101, 100  Ronnie O'Sullivan
 110, 104  Steve Davis

References

2003
Premier League
Premier League Snooker